Martha Elizabeth Hodes (born June 12, 1958) is an American historian. She is a professor of History at New York University, and the author of several books. She won the Lincoln Prize in 2016.

Early life and education
Hodes was born on June 12, 1958. She earned her Bachelor of Arts degree from Bowdoin College, her Master's degree from Harvard University and her PhD from Princeton University.

References

Living people
1958 births
21st-century American historians
New York University faculty
Lincoln Prize winners
Harvard University alumni
Princeton University alumni
Bowdoin College alumni